The 1979 NBA playoffs was the postseason tournament of the National Basketball Association’s 1978–79 season. The tournament concluded with the Western Conference champion Seattle SuperSonics defeating the Eastern Conference champion Washington Bullets 4 games to 1 in the NBA Finals. The Sonics earned their only NBA title. Dennis Johnson was named NBA Finals MVP.

The Finals was a rematch of 1978, in which Washington defeated Seattle 4–3. , this remains the last time the Bullets (now the Wizards) have advanced as far as the Conference Finals. They have the longest conference finals drought of any team in the four major professional sports in North America.

The Spurs made their first visit to the Conference Finals in these playoffs.

This was the first time that three of the former ABA teams made the playoffs, as it was the NBA playoff debut of the New Jersey Nets.

This was the first time both conference finals went to a deciding Game 7 since 1963 and the last until 2018.

Bracket

First round

Eastern Conference first round

(3) Philadelphia 76ers vs. (6) New Jersey Nets

This was the first playoff meeting between these two teams.

(4) Houston Rockets vs. (5) Atlanta Hawks

This was the second playoff meeting between these two teams, with the Hawks winning the only previous meeting.

Western Conference first round

(3) Phoenix Suns vs. (6) Portland Trail Blazers

This was the first playoff meeting between these two teams.

(4) Denver Nuggets vs. (5) Los Angeles Lakers

This was the first playoff meeting between these two teams.

Conference semifinals

Eastern Conference semifinals

(1) Washington Bullets vs. (5) Atlanta Hawks

This was the fourth playoff meeting between these two teams, with the Wizards/Bullets winning two of the first three meetings.

(2) San Antonio Spurs vs. (3) Philadelphia 76ers

 Maurice Cheeks hits game winning shot with 10 seconds remaining.

This was the first meeting between these two teams.

Western Conference semifinals

(1) Seattle SuperSonics vs. (5) Los Angeles Lakers

 This would be the last playoff series for Los Angeles without Magic Johnson until 1992.

This was the second playoff meeting between these two teams, with the SuperSonics winning the first meeting.

(2) Kansas City Kings vs. (3) Phoenix Suns

This was the first playoff meeting between these two teams.

Conference finals

Eastern Conference finals

(1) Washington Bullets vs. (2) San Antonio Spurs

 Bob Dandridge hits series-winning shot with 8 seconds remaining; Washington becomes the 3rd team in NBA history to overcome a 3–1 series deficit.

This was the second playoff meeting between these two teams, with the Bullets winning the first meeting.

Western Conference finals

(1) Seattle SuperSonics vs. (3) Phoenix Suns

In a Mother's Day Thriller, The Game went down to the wire in intense fashion.  The Sonics had just came back from a 8 point deficit in the 4th quarter & the score was 106-105 in favor of the Sonics with 52 Seconds to go in Regulation as the suns had the ball, In that Possession, Walter Davis appeared to have scored, but committed a traveling violation at 41 seconds.  On The Next Play, Sonics Player Gus Williams' shot came up short, Phoenix grabbed the rebound and called timeout at 16 seconds left, With a chance to clinch their 2nd NBA Finals berth, Walter Davis' high-arc shot also came up short, the ball went out-of-bounds last touched by a Sonics' Player with one second left.  The Suns had one last chance, Gar Heard's Potential game winning shot was an airball, meaning the SuperSonics forced a 7th game in Seattle on Thursday.

With the score 112-104 in Favor of Seattle with just 20 seconds left, it appeared to be all over, but the Phoenix Suns would not quit easily.  They immediately went on a 6-0 run in just 16 seconds, at the end of the run with 7 seconds to go, Paul Westphal stole an inbounds pass and then drove to the basket for a score, who was fouled by Wally Walker of the Sonics, making it just a 2 point game and sending Westphal to the line with just 4 seconds left, This allowed Suns Coach John MacLeod to call a timeout to decide what to do on the free throw attempt, The Suns elected to intentionally miss in hoping for an offensive rebound, but the rebound went to the Sonics' Jack Sikma, who then made both free throws to give the Sonics the Western Conference for the 2nd straight year.

This was the second playoff meeting between these two teams, with the Suns winning the only meeting.

NBA Finals: (E1) Washington Bullets vs. (W1) Seattle SuperSonics

 Larry Wright makes the game winning free throws with one second remaining.

 Dennis Johnson blocks Kevin Grevey with 4 seconds left to seal it.

This was the second Finals meeting between these two teams, with the Bullets winning the first meeting.

References

External links
 Basketball-Reference.com's 1979 NBA Playoffs page

National Basketball Association playoffs
Playoffs
Sports in Portland, Oregon

fi:NBA-kausi 1978–1979#Pudotuspelit